A list of 4th century Christian Theologians:

See also 

Christianity in the 4th century
List of Church Fathers